Kim Clijsters was the defending champion, but did not compete this year due to a recovery from a cyst surgery.

Lindsay Davenport won the tournament, defeating Serena Williams 6–1, 6–3 in the final.

Seeds
The first eight seeds received a bye into the second round.

Draw

Finals

Top half

Section 1

Section 2

Bottom half

Section 3

Section 4

External links
 Main and Qualifying draws

JPMorgan Chase Open Singles
2004 Women's Singles